The 1974 Hawaii Open, also known by its sponsored name Island Holidays Pro Tennis Classic, was a men's tennis tournament played an outdoor hard courts in Maui, Hawaii in the United States. It was the inaugural edition of the tournament and was held from September 30 through October 6, 1974. The tournament was part of the Grand Prix tennis circuit and categorized in Group B. Second-seeded John Newcombe won the singles title and $9,000 first-prize money.

Finals

Singles
 John Newcombe defeated  Roscoe Tanner 7–6, 7–6
 It was Newcombe's 7th singles title of the year and the 29th of his career in the open era.

Doubles
 Dick Stockton /  Roscoe Tanner defeated  Owen Davidson /  John Newcombe 6–3, 7–6

References

Hawaii Open
Hawaii Open
Hawaii Open
Hawaii Open
Hawaii Open